The 2017 Israel Super Cup is the 22nd Israel Super Cup (27th, including unofficial matches, as the competition wasn't played within the Israel Football Association in its first 5 editions, until 1969), an annual Israel football match played between the winners of the previous season's Top Division and Israel State Cup. This is the second time since 1990 that the match was staged, after a planned resumption of the cup was cancelled in 2014.

The game was played between Hapoel Be'er Sheva, champions of the 2016–17 Israeli Premier League and Bnei Yehuda Tel Aviv, winners of the 2016-17 Israeli State Cup. As it has ended with the score of 4-2 to Hapoel Be'er Sheva after draw 1-1 in the half time.

Match details

References

Israel Super Cup
2017–18 in Israeli football
Israel Super Cup
Super Cup 2017
Super Cup 2017
Israel Super Cup matches